The Wings of the Dove is a 1981 French drama film directed by Benoît Jacquot and starring Isabelle Huppert. The film was adapted from the 1902 novel of the same name by Henry James.

Cast
 Isabelle Huppert as Marie
 Dominique Sanda as Catherine Croy
 Michele Placido as Sandro
 Loleh Bellon as Suzanne Berger
 Françoise Christophe as La mère de Marc
 Gérard Falconetti as Marc
 Veronica Lazar
 Paul Le Person as Le père de Catherine
 Danilo Mattei
 Odile Michel as La soeur de Catherine
 Jean Sorel as Lukirsh

See also
 Isabelle Huppert on screen and stage

References

External links
 

1981 films
1980s French-language films
1981 drama films
French drama films
Films directed by Benoît Jacquot
Films scored by Philippe Sarde
Films based on works by Henry James
Films based on American novels
Gaumont Film Company films
1980s French films